"Jaded" is a song by American hard rock band Aerosmith. It was written by lead singer Steven Tyler and songwriting collaborator Marti Frederiksen. Serviced to US radio in January 2001, the single was released on February 20, 2001, as the first single from the band's 13th studio album, Just Push Play (2001). The song was debuted publicly at the American Music Awards and was also played at the halftime show for Super Bowl XXXV in January 2001. It was ranked No. 86 on VH1's 100 Greatest Songs of the '00s.

"Jaded" would become Aerosmith's final chart hit in most territories. It reached number one on both the US Billboard Mainstream Rock chart and the UK Rock Chart, while reaching the top 10 on the Billboard Hot 100 and in Canada and Scotland. On the UK Singles Chart, the song reached number 13 and became the band's eighth top-twenty single on that chart; it currently remains their last UK top-forty hit. "Jaded" additionally reached the top 20 in Italy, the Netherlands and Spain. In 2002, it was nominated for a Grammy Award for Best Rock Performance by a Duo or Group with Vocal.

Lyrics and music
Tyler was inspired to write the song based on missing much of his daughter Liv Tyler's childhood while being on the road with his band.  The song's lyrics are about a girl who is "jaded", and how the relationship the narrator has with the girl is sometimes "complicated", but asserts that "I'm the one that jaded you." Tyler stated that "When I hit on the melody for 'Jaded,' it was so phenomenal that for a while I was scared to do anything more with it. I didn't even tell the band."

Cover artwork
The single's artwork was somewhat controversial, featuring a naked woman holding an apple on the cover. The model in the artwork is Nicole West.

Music video
The video for "Jaded" features Aerosmith performing in the lobby of the Los Angeles Theater, and clips of a "jaded" girl (actress Mila Kunis). The song tells a story of a girl who has lost the ability to feel due to losing touch with reality.

The Los Angeles Theater is a movie palace in downtown Los Angeles and is extravagantly designed in the French Rococo style. The video also features the ballroom/lounge, the landing on the way to the ballroom, auditorium, and the mezzanine hallway. The hallway shot uses either a mirror, or special effects, to multiply the doors and make the hallway seem endless.

There are two versions of the video, much of the footage is the same, though used in slightly different places, and some shots have alternate angles. In the first version, the opening shot features a quick zoom on the stage, Steven Tyler blows into the camera, and he is shown when the music starts in the forest interlude. In the second version, the opening shot features a slow zoom on the stage, a horse statue blows into the camera, and Tyler is not shown when the music starts in the forest interlude.

The video premiered on MTV on February 13, 2001, and was directed by Francis Lawrence. The video was awarded Best Hard Rock Clip of the Year at the Billboard Music Video Awards, and Video of the Year at the Boston Music Awards.

Track listings

Charts

Weekly charts

Year-end charts

Certifications

Release history

References

2000 songs
2001 singles
Aerosmith songs
American alternative rock songs
American pop rock songs
Columbia Records singles
Music videos directed by Francis Lawrence
Songs written by Marti Frederiksen
Songs written by Steven Tyler